Mukul Dev (born 17 September 1970) is an Indian television and film actor. He is known for his work in Hindi films, Punjabi films, TV serials and music albums. He has also acted in few Bengali, Malayalam, Kannada and Telugu films.
He received the 7th Amrish Puri Award, for excellence in acting for his role in Yamla Pagla Deewana.

He is also a trained pilot from the Indira Gandhi Rashtriya Uran Akademi.

Career
Mukul Dev made his acting debut on TV through a serial Mumkin playing the role of Vijay Pandey in 1996. He also acted in Doordarshan's Ek Se Badh Kar Ek, a comedy Bollywood countdown show,

He made his film debut in the film Dastak as ACP Rohit Malhotra in the same year which also introduced crowned Miss Universe Sushmita Sen. He appeared in several films such as Qila (1998), Wajood (1998), Kohram (1999) and Mujhe Meri Biwi Se Bachaao (2001). He acted in several television serials in the 2000s such as Kahin Diyaa Jale Kahin Jiyaa (2001), Kahaani Ghar Ghar Kii (2003), Pyar Zindagi Hai (2003) and participated in a dance competition show Kabhi Kabhii Pyaar Kabhi Kabhii Yaar (2008). In recent years he has played supporting roles in films like Yamla Pagla Deewana (2011), Son of Sardaar (2012), R... Rajkumar (2013) and Jai Ho (2014).

He was also the host of Fear Factor India of Season 1.

Filmography

Film

Television

Web series

Dubbing roles

Live action films

References

External links
 

21st-century Indian male actors
Living people
Punjabi people
St. Columba's School, Delhi alumni
Male actors in Telugu cinema
Indian male film actors
Male actors in Kannada cinema
Male actors from Delhi
20th-century Indian male actors
Indian male models
1959 births